Prymorske is a village in Novoazovsk Raion, Ukraine.

Villages in Kalmiuske Raion